The second stage of the 2012 Copa Santander Libertadores de América ran from February 7 to April 19, 2012 (match days: February 7–9, 14–16, 21–23, March 6–8, 13–15, 20–22, 27–29, April 3–5, 10–12, 17–19).

Format
Twenty-six teams qualified directly into this round, to be joined by the six winners of the first stage. The thirty-two teams were drawn into eight groups of four on November 25, 2011, in Asunción.

The teams in each group played each other in a double round-robin format, playing the other teams in the group once at home and once away. Each team earned 3 points for a win, 1 point for a draw, and 0 points for a loss. The following criteria were used for breaking ties on points:
Goal difference
Goals scored
Away goals
Drawing of lots
The top two teams from each group advanced to the round of 16.

Groups

Group 1

Group 2

Group 3

Group 4

Group 5

Group 6

Group 7

Group 8

References

External links
Official webpage  

Second Stage